The David Jones House in Maryville, Tennessee, also known as the George Burchfield House, is a Second Empire style house built in 1887.  It was built by Maryville brick-maker and builder David Jones.

The house is Blount County's only extant example of a residence built in the Second Empire style.  It has a straight-sided mansard roof and prominent stone quoining.

It was listed on the National Register of Historic Places in 1982.

Jones also built the NRHP-listed David Jones House on High Street.

References

Maryville, Tennessee
Houses on the National Register of Historic Places in Tennessee
Second Empire architecture in Tennessee
Houses completed in 1887
Houses in Blount County, Tennessee
National Register of Historic Places in Blount County, Tennessee